Voskresenskaya Slobodka is a rural locality (a selo) in Pavlovskoye Rural Settlement, Suzdalsky District, Vladimir Oblast, Russia. The population was 23 as of 2010. There are 5 streets.

Geography 
Voskresenskaya Slobodka is located on the right bank of the Nerl River, 32 km southeast of Suzdal (the district's administrative centre) by road. Mordysh is the nearest rural locality.

References 

Rural localities in Suzdalsky District
Suzdalsky Uyezd